

This is intended to be a complete list of the properties and districts on the National Register of Historic Places in San Francisco, California, United States. Latitude and longitude coordinates are provided for many National Register properties and districts; these locations may be seen together in an online map.

There are 203 properties and districts listed on the National Register in the city, including 18 National Historic Landmarks. Another three properties were once listed but have been removed.

Current listings

|}

Former listings

|}

See also

California Historical Landmarks in San Francisco
List of National Historic Landmarks in California
List of San Francisco Designated Landmarks
National Register of Historic Places listings in California

References

External links
List of San Francisco historic landmarks
List of City of S.F., California, and Federal landmarks in San Francisco
Early history of the California Coast: San Francisco - clickable map and descriptions.
World War II in the San Francisco Bay Area - National Register travel itinerary

San Francisco
San Francisco-related lists
San Francisco
San Francisco, California